The Lagos Rail Mass Transit Blue Line  (hereafter Blue Line) is a rapid transit system that runs in Lagos, Nigeria. It is part of the Lagos Rail Mass Transit system run by the Lagos Metropolitan Area Transport Authority.

History

In April 2008, the Lagos State Government approved ₦ 70 billion for construction of the Okokomaiko-Iddo-Marina Line, with an estimated completion date of 2011. However, the project suffered many delays due to lack of funds. The opening date was revised to June 2013, then December 2016, then 2017. As of November 2016, only 16 km of the 27 km Blue Line had been completed.

Development plan
Lagos State is financing construction of the Blue Line with its own resources. The proposed advantages of the blue line are that is will allow commuters to spend less time travelling in the area by avoiding traffic jams which can take many hours to get through, whilst also being cheaper.

Contractors
The contract was awarded to the China Civil Engineering Construction Corporation (CCECC), with advisory services being provided by CPCS Transcom Limited.

Planned route
The Blue Line will run  from Okokomaiko to Lagos Marina, with 13 stations and an end-to-end journey time of 35 minutes. The entire Blue Line will operate over a secure and exclusive right-of-way, with no level crossings and no uncontrolled access by pedestrians or vehicles. The route will run on the surface in the central reservation of the Lagos-Badagry Expressway between Igbo-Elerin Road (Okokomaiko) and Iganmu. The line will then be elevated from Iganmu along the south side of the expressway passing the junction with Eric Moore Road, crossing just south of the National Theatre to Iddo, then south to Lagos Island with a terminal at Marina. A Maintenance and Storage Facility (MSF) will be constructed at Okokomaiko, with a track connection from the Blue Line to the depot.

Phase I
The first phase was opened on 21 December 2022. However passenger operation hasn't started yet and passenger operation is planned to start in Spring 2023. This phase travels  from Lagos Marina to Mile 2. The 5 stations being opened are: Lagos Marina, National Theatre, Orile Iganmu, Suru Alaba, Mile 2. The line is undergoing testing during December 2022 and January 2023 before opening to passengers.

Phase II
Construction of the second phase, from Mile 2 to Okokomaiko, will commence after the first phase opens for passenger service. This is expected to be in the first quarter of 2023.

References

External links
LAMATA website on LRMT

Lagos Metropolitan Area Transport Authority
Rapid transit in Nigeria
Public transport in Lagos
Rail infrastructure in Lagos
Railway lines opened in 2023